Ognøya or Ogn is an island in Bokn municipality in Rogaland county, Norway.  The  island lies between the mainland and the islands of Austre Bokn and Vestre Bokn.  The islands are connected by a series of bridges as part of the European route E39 highway.  The industrial area of Kårstø lies just north of Ognøya on the mainland.

The island is mostly rocky and barren with little population. There is a small group of houses on the southern part of the island in the one relatively flat, arable area on the island.

See also
List of islands of Norway

References

Islands of Rogaland
Bokn